Dún Aonghasa (Unofficial anglicised version Dun Aengus) is the best-known of several prehistoric hill forts on the Aran Islands of County Galway, Ireland. It lies on Inis Mór, at the edge of a  cliff.

A popular tourist attraction, Dún Aonghasa is an important archaeological site.

History
It is not known exactly when Dún Aonghasa was built, though it is now thought that most of the structures date from the Bronze Age and Iron Age. T. F. O'Rahilly surmised in what is known as O'Rahilly's historical model that it was built in the 2nd century BC by the Builg following the Laginian conquest of Connacht. Excavations at the site indicate that the first construction goes back to 1100 BC, when rubble was piled against large upright stones to form the first enclosure. Around 500 BC, the triple wall defenses were probably constructed along the fort's western side. 
 
The 19th-century artist George Petrie called Dún Aonghasa "the most magnificent barbaric monument in Europe". Its name, meaning "Fort of Aonghas", may refer to the pre-Christian god of the same name described in Irish mythology, or the mythical king, Aonghus mac Úmhór. It has thus traditionally been associated with the Fir Bolg.

Form and function
The fort consists of a series of four concentric walls of dry stone construction, built on a high cliff some one hundred metres above the sea. At the time of its construction sea levels were considerably lower and a recent Radio Telefis Eireann documentary estimates that originally it was 1000 metres from the sea. Surviving stonework is four metres wide at some points.  The original shape was presumably oval or D-shaped but parts of the cliff and fort have since collapsed into the sea. Outside the third ring of walls lies a defensive system of stone slabs, known as a cheval de frise, planted in an upright position in the ground and still largely well-preserved. These ruins also feature a huge rectangular stone slab, the function of which is unknown.  Impressively large among prehistoric ruins, the outermost wall of Dún Aonghasa encloses an area of approximately 6 hectares (14 acres).

Today
The walls of Dún Aonghasa have been rebuilt to a height of 6m and have wall walks, chambers, and flights of stairs. The restoration is easily distinguished from the original construction by the use of mortar.

There is a small museum illustrating the history of the fort and its possible functions. Also in the vicinity is a Neolithic tomb and a small heritage park featuring examples of a traditional thatched cottage and an illegal poteen distillery.

Nearby sites
Dún Dúchathair ("Black Stone Ringfort"), Dún Eoghanachta ("Fort of the Eóganachta"), and Dún Eochla are similar prehistoric sites on Inis Mór. Dún Chonchúir ("Fort of Conchobar") is located on nearby Inis Meáin.

Image gallery

See also
Atlantic Bronze Age

References

External links

 Short YouTube video of the Dun Aengus cliff face
 Dun Aengus website 
 Dun Aengus page for the Aran Islands website

Forts in the Republic of Ireland
Hill forts in Ireland
Archaeological sites in County Galway
Aran Islands
National Monuments in County Galway
Former populated places in Ireland